is a Japanese professional footballer who plays as a midfielder for J2 League club Tochigi SC, on loan from FC Tokyo.

Club career
Yasuda was registered as a type-2 player for the 2021 season with FC Tokyo.

In December 2022, it was announced that Yasuda would be joining J2 League club Tochigi SC on loan for the 2023 season.

International career
Yasuda has represented Japan at under-16 and under-17 level.

Career statistics

Club
.

References

External links

2003 births
Living people
Association football people from Ishikawa Prefecture
Japanese footballers
Japan youth international footballers
Association football midfielders
J1 League players
J2 League players
J3 League players
FC Tokyo players
FC Tokyo U-23 players
Tochigi SC players